U-48 may refer to one of the following German submarines:

 , a Type U 43 submarine launched in 1915 and that served in the First World War until scuttled on 24 November 1917
 During the First World War, Germany also had these submarines with similar names:
 , a Type UB III submarine launched in 1917 and scuttled on 28 October 1918
 , a Type UC II submarine launched in 1916 and interned in Spain on 23 March 1918
 , a Type VIIB submarine that served in the Second World War until scuttled on 3 May 1945

Submarines of Germany